The Des Moines River Bridge is a historic bridge located southwest of Swea City, Iowa, United States. In February 1916, the Kossuth County Board of Supervisors approved the contract for the Des Moines Marsh Engineering Company to build the bridges. It was designed by the company's engineer James B. Marsh. The 9-panel Marsh fixed arch bridge, also known as a "rainbow arch", was completed in 1916 for $7,150. It features two tapered concrete arches that carry the roadway in between them from hangers. It was listed on the National Register of Historic Places in 1998.

References

Bridges completed in 1916
Transportation buildings and structures in Kossuth County, Iowa
Road bridges on the National Register of Historic Places in Iowa
Arch bridges in Iowa
National Register of Historic Places in Kossuth County, Iowa
Concrete bridges in the United States